Daniel Dion (1958 – September 28, 2014) was a Canadian contemporary artist.

Career
Dion was known primarily as a video artist.  Dion was also a cofounder, in 1982 with Sue Schnee, of the Montreal art gallery OBORO.

Collections
Dion's work is included in the permanent collection of the National Gallery of Canada and the Musée national des beaux-arts du Québec.

References

Canadian video artists
Artists from Montreal
1958 births
2014 deaths